The Creation of Meaning is a 2014 experimental film directed by Simone Rapisarda Casanova.

Plot 
An elderly shepherd, Pacifico Pieruccioni, is forced by the economic crisis to give up his house and land in the Italian mountains, where his parents had fought in the Resistance against the German Army during World War II. Oddly enough, the prospective buyer is a young German. The two of them start a conversation about history and present-day Italy.

Production 
The Creation of Meaning is the second feature film by Simone Rapisarda Casanova. It is set and shot in the Apuan Alps, the landscape once crossed by the Gothic Line. The film is an experimental hybrid fiction-documentary inspired by Jorge Luis Borges's short story The Aleph. Rapisarda Casanova’s stylistic hallmarks include his elliptical, metacinematic approach to storytelling, his unconventional use of non-actors, his use of natural light and colour inspired by renaissance paintings, along with meticulously-composed static single-takes and diegetic soundscapes. His approach to filmmaking is mostly process-driven, after careful research of the thematic base. The intent behind such stylistic and methodological choices is to create a cinematic occasion where people and places may reveal their deepest nature.

Release and critical response 

The Creation of Meaning won the Best Emerging Director award at the Locarno Film Festival in 2014; in 2015 it won the Best of Festival award at the Ann Arbor Film Festival and was acquired and released theatrically by the Museum of Modern Art, New York and by the National Gallery of Art, Washington DC. The film has a 100% Fresh rating on Rotten Tomatoes.

Awards 

2014 
 Best Emerging Director award, Locarno Film Festival, Switzerland

2015 
 Best of Festival award, Ann Arbor Film Festival, MI, USA
 Best Film award, Las Palmas de Gran Canaria International Film Festival, Spain
 Best Documentary award, Yerevan International Film Festival, Armenia

Collections

 Museum of Modern Art, New York, NY, USA
 National Gallery of Art, Washington DC, USA

References

External links 
 Official webpage of The Creation of Meaning at Ibidemfilms.org
 
 

Films about filmmaking
Self-reflexive films
2014 films
2010s avant-garde and experimental films
2014 documentary films
Italian avant-garde and experimental films
Canadian avant-garde and experimental films
Italian documentary films
Canadian docufiction films
Films set in Italy
Films shot in Tuscany
2010s Italian-language films
Ethnofiction films
2010s Canadian films